The Egyptian Roller Hockey Championship is the biggest Roller Hockey Clubs Championship in Egypt.

Participated Teams in the last Season
The clubs that competed in the season of 2011 were: Al-Zamalek Sporting Club, Al-Dakhlyea, Nasr City, Al-Sekka, Al-Hadeed, Al-Masry, Al-Zohour, Al-Marekh, Al-Maadi, Al-Kahrabaa, Alaab Damanhour.

List of Winners

{| class="wikitable"
|-
!Year
!Champion
|-
|2014/6'|ALaab Damanhour
|-
|2011/12
|AL-Dakhlyea
|-
|2010/11
|ALaab Damanhour
|-
|2009/10
|Alaab Damanhour
|-
|2008/09
|Alaab Damanhour
|-
|2007/08
|Alaab Damanhour
|-
|2006/07
|Nasr City Sporting Club
|}

Egyptian CupEgyptian Cup is the second main competition of Roller Hockey in Egypt and is disputed by all the Roller Hockey''' clubs in Egypt.

Winners

External links

Egypt websites
Blog about Roller Hockey in Egypt
Roller Hockey in Egypt

International
 Roller Hockey links worldwide
 Mundook-World Roller Hockey
Hardballhock-World Roller Hockey
Inforoller World Roller Hockey
 World Roller Hockey Blog
rink-hockey-news - World Roller Hockey
HoqueiPatins.cat - World Roller Hockey

Roller hockey competitions in Egypt
Egypt
Recurring sporting events established in 2007
2007 establishments in Egypt
Roller Hockey